ILOVEYOU, sometimes referred to as Love Bug or Love Letter for you, is a computer worm that infected over ten million Windows personal computers on and after 5 May 2000. It started spreading as an email message with the subject line "ILOVEYOU" and the attachment "LOVE-LETTER-FOR-YOU.TXT.vbs." At the time, Windows computers often hid the latter file extension ("VBS," a type of interpreted file) by default because it is an extension for a file type that Windows knows, leading unwitting users to think it was a normal text file. Opening the attachment activates the Visual Basic script. First, the worm inflicts damage on the local machine, overwriting random files (including Office files and image files; however, it hides MP3 files instead of deleting them), then, it copies itself to all addresses in the Windows Address Book used by Microsoft Outlook, allowing it to spread much faster than any other previous email worm.

Onel de Guzman, a then-24-year-old resident of Manila, Philippines, created the malware. Because there were no laws in the Philippines against making malware at the time of its creation, the Philippine Congress enacted Republic Act No. 8792, otherwise known as the E-Commerce Law, in July 2000 to discourage future iterations of such activity. However, the Constitution of the Philippines bans ex post facto laws, and as such de Guzman could not be prosecuted.

Creation 
ILOVEYOU was created by Onel de Guzman aka Lto3, a college student in Manila, Philippines, who was 24 years old at the time. De Guzman, who was poor and struggling to pay for Internet access at the time, created the computer worm intending to steal other users' passwords, which he could use to log in to their Internet accounts without needing to pay for the service. He justified his actions on his belief that Internet access is a human right and that he was not actually stealing.

The worm used the same principles that de Guzman had described in his undergraduate thesis at AMA Computer College. He stated that the worm was very easy to create, thanks to a bug in Windows 95 that would run code in email attachments when the user clicked on them. Originally designing the worm to only work in Manila, he removed this geographic restriction out of curiosity, which allowed the worm to spread worldwide. De Guzman did not expect this worldwide spread.

Description
On the machine system level, ILOVEYOU relied on the scripting engine system setting (which runs scripting language files such as .vbs files) being enabled and took advantage of a feature in Windows that hid file extensions by default, which malware authors would use as an exploit.  Windows would parse file names from right to left, stopping at the first period character, showing only those elements to the left of this. The attachment, which had two periods, could thus display the inner fake "TXT" file extension.  True text files are considered to be innocuous as they are incapable of running arbitrary code. The worm used social engineering to entice users to open the attachment (out of actual desire to connect or simple curiosity) to ensure continued propagation. Systemic weaknesses in the design of Microsoft Outlook and Microsoft Windows were exploited to allow malicious code capable of gaining complete access to the operating system, secondary storage, and system and user data in, simply through unwitting users clicking on an icon.

Spread
Messages generated in the Philippines began to spread westwards through corporate email systems. Because the worm used mailing lists as its source of targets, the messages often appeared to come from acquaintances and were therefore often regarded as "safe" by their victims, providing further incentive to open them. Only a few users at each site had to access the attachment to generate millions more messages that crippled mail systems and overwrote millions of files on computers in each successive network.

Impact
The worm originated in the Pandacan neighborhood of Manila in the Philippines on 4 May 2000, thereafter following daybreak westward across the world as employees began their workday that Friday morning, moving first to Hong Kong, then to Europe, and finally the United States. The outbreak was later estimated to have caused US$5.5–8.7 billion in damages worldwide, and estimated to cost US$10–15 billion to remove the worm. Within ten days, over fifty million infections had been reported, and it is estimated that 10% of Internet-connected computers in the world had been affected. Damage cited was mostly the time and effort spent getting rid of the infection and recovering files from backups. To protect themselves, The Pentagon, CIA, the British Parliament and most large corporations decided to completely shut down their mail systems. At the time, it was one of the world's most destructive computer related disasters ever.

The events inspired the song "E-mail" on the Pet Shop Boys' UK top-ten album of 2002, Release, the lyrics of which play thematically on the human desires which enabled the mass destruction of this computer infection.

Architecture
De Guzman wrote the ILOVEYOU script (the attachment) in Microsoft Visual Basic Scripting (VBS), which ran in Microsoft Outlook and was enabled by default. The script adds Windows Registry data for automatic startup on system boot.

The worm searches connected drives and replaces files with extensions JPG, JPEG, VBS, VBE, JS, JSE, CSS, WSH, SCT, DOC, HTA, MP2, and MP3 with copies of itself, while appending the additional file extension VBS. However, MP3s and other sound-related files would be hidden rather than overwritten.

The worm propagates itself by sending one copy of the payload to each entry in the Microsoft Outlook address book (Windows Address Book). It also downloads the Barok trojan renamed for the occasion as "WIN-BUGSFIX.EXE."

The fact that the worm was written in VBS allowed users to modify it. A user could easily change the worm to replace essential files and destroy the system, allowing more than 25 variations of ILOVEYOU to spread across the Internet, each doing different kinds of damage. Most of the variations had to do with what file extensions were affected by the worm. Others modified the email subject to target a specific audience, like the variant "Cartolina" in Italian or "BabyPic" for adults. Some others only changed the credits to the author, which were initially included in the standard version of the virus, removing them entirely or referencing false authors. Still, others overwrote "EXE" and "COM" files. The user's computer would then be unbootable upon restarting.

Some mail messages sent by ILOVEYOU include:

 VIRUS ALERT!!
 Important! Read Carefully!!

Investigation
On 5 May 2000, two young Filipino programmers named Reonel Ramones and Onel De Guzman became targets of a criminal investigation by agents of the Philippines' National Bureau of Investigation (NBI). Local Internet service provider Sky Internet had reported receiving numerous contacts from European computer users alleging that malware (in the form of the "ILOVEYOU" worm) had been sent via the ISP's servers.

De Guzman attempted to hide the evidence by removing his computer from his apartment, but he accidentally left some disks behind that contained the worm, as well as information that implicated Michael Buen as a possible co-conspirator.

After surveillance and investigation by Darwin Bawasanta of Sky Internet, the NBI traced a frequently appearing telephone number to Ramones' apartment in Manila. His residence was searched and Ramones was arrested and placed under investigation by the Department of Justice (DOJ). Onel De Guzman was also charged in absentia.

At that point, the NBI were unsure what felony or crime would apply. It was suggested they be charged with violating Republic Act 8484 (the Access Device Regulation Act), a law designed mainly to penalise credit card fraud, since both used pre-paid (if not stolen) Internet cards to purchase access to ISPs. Another idea was that they be charged with malicious mischief, a felony (under the Philippines Revised Penal Code of 1932) involving damage to property. The drawback here was that one of its elements, aside from damage to property, was intent to damage, and De Guzman had claimed during custodial investigations that he might have unwittingly released the worm. At a press conference organised by his lawyer on 11 May, he said "It is possible" when asked whether he might have done so.

To show intent, the NBI investigated AMA Computer College, where De Guzman had dropped out at the very end of his final year. They found that, for his undergraduate thesis, he had proposed the implementation of a trojan to steal Internet login passwords. This, he claimed, would allow users to finally be able to afford an Internet connection. The proposal was rejected by the college of Computer Studies board, leading De Guzman to claim that his professors were closed-minded.

Aftermath
Since there were no laws in the Philippines against writing malware at the time, both Ramones and de Guzman were released with all charges dropped by state prosecutors. To address this legislative deficiency, the Philippine Congress enacted Republic Act No. 8792, otherwise known as the E-Commerce Law, in July 2000, months after the worm outbreak.

In 2012, the Smithsonian Institution named ILOVEYOU one of the top ten most virulent computer viruses in history.

De Guzman did not want public attention. His last known public appearance was at the 2000 press conference, where he obscured his face and allowed his lawyer to answer most questions; his whereabouts remained unknown for 20 years afterward. In May 2020, investigative journalist Geoff White revealed that while researching his cybercrime book Crime Dot Com, he had found Onel de Guzman working at a mobile phone repair stall in Manila. De Guzman admitted to creating and releasing the virus. He claimed he had initially developed it to steal Internet access passwords, since he could not afford to pay for access. He also stated that he created it alone, clearing the two others who had been accused of co-writing the worm.

See also
Christmas Tree EXEC
Code Red worm
Computer virus
NewLove (computer worm)
Nimda (computer worm)
Timeline of notable computer viruses and worms

References

External links
The Love Bug - A Retrospect
ILOVEYOU Virus Lessons Learned Report, Army Forces Command
Radsoft: The ILOVEYOU Roundup
"No 'sorry' from Love Bug author" at The Register
CERT Advisory CA-2000-04 Love Letter Worm

Computer worms
Email worms
Communications in the Philippines
2000 in the Philippines
Hacking in the 2000s
2000 introductions